The Montessori method of education involves children's natural interests and activities rather than  formal teaching methods. A Montessori classroom places an emphasis on hands-on learning and developing real-world skills. It emphasizes independence and it views children as naturally eager for knowledge and capable of initiating learning in a sufficiently supportive and well-prepared learning environment. It discourages some conventional measures of achievement, such as grades and tests.

The method was started in the early 20th century by Italian physician Maria Montessori, who developed her theories through scientific experimentation with her students; the method has since been used in many parts of the world, in public and private schools alike.

A range of practices exists under the name "Montessori", which is not trademarked. Popular elements include mixed-age classrooms, student freedom (including their choices of activity), long blocks of uninterrupted work time, specially trained teachers and prepared environment. Scientific studies regarding the Montessori method are mostly positive,  with a 2017 review stating that "broad evidence" exists for its efficacy.

History

Following her medical training, Maria Montessori began developing her educational philosophy and methods in 1897, attending courses in pedagogy at the University of Rome and learning educational theory. While visiting Rome's mental asylums during her schooling with a teacher, Montessori observed that confined children were in need of more stimulation from their environment. In 1907, she opened her first classroom, the Casa dei Bambini, or Children's House, in a tenement building in Rome. From the beginning, Montessori based her work on her observations of children and experimentation with the environment, materials, and lessons available to them. She frequently referred to her work as "scientific pedagogy".

In 1901, Maria Montessori met the prominent education reformers Alice and Leopoldo Franchetti. Maria Montessori was invited to hold her first course for teachers and to set up a "Casa dei Bambini" at Villa Montesca, the home of the Franchettis in Città di Castello. Montessori lived with the Franchettis for two years and refined her methodology together with Alice Franchetti. In 1909, she documented her theories in Il metodo della pedagogia scientifica (later translated into English as The Montessori Method in 1912). The Franchetti Barons financed the publication of the book, and the methodology had the name "Method Franchetti-Montessori".

Montessori education had spread to the United States by 1912 and became widely known in educational and popular publications. In 1913 Narcissa Cox Vanderlip and Frank A. Vanderlip founded the Scarborough School, the first Montessori school in the U.S. However, conflict arose between Montessori and the American educational establishment. The 1914 critical booklet The Montessori System Examined by influential education teacher William Heard Kilpatrick limited the spread of Montessori's ideas, and they languished after 1914. Montessori education returned to the United States in 1960 and has since spread to thousands of schools there. Montessori continued to extend her work during her lifetime, developing a comprehensive model of psychological development from birth to age 24, as well as educational approaches for children ages 0 to 3, 3 to 6, and 6 to 12.

Montessori education also spread throughout the world, including Southeast Asia and India, where Maria Montessori was interned during World War II. In October 1931, Indian independence leader Mahatma Gandhi met with Maria Montessori in London. At the time, Gandhi was very interested in the role the Montessori method might play in helping to build an independent nation. Thus, initially, Montessori education in India was connected to the Indian independence movement. Later, elite, private Montessori schools also arose, and in the 1950s, some Montessori schools opened to serve children from lower-socioeconomic families, a trend that continues today with foundation and government-funded schools.

Methods

Montessori education is based on a model of human development. This educational style operates abiding by two beliefs: that psychological self-construction in children and developing adults occurs through environmental interactions and that children (especially under the age of six) have an innate path of psychological development.  Based on her observations, Montessori believed that children who are at liberty to choose and act freely within an environment prepared according to her model would act spontaneously for optimal development.

Although a range of practices exists under the "Montessori" name, the Association Montessori Internationale (AMI) and the American Montessori Society (AMS) cite these elements as essential:

 Mixed-age classrooms: classrooms for children ages  or 3 to 6 years old are by far the most common, but 0–3, 6–9, 9–12, 12–15, and 15–18-year-old classrooms exist as well
 Student choice of activity from within a prescribed range of options
 Uninterrupted blocks of work time, ideally three hours long
 A constructivist or "discovery" model, in which students learn concepts from working with materials rather than by direct instruction
 Specialized educational materials are often made out of natural, aesthetic materials such as wood, rather than plastic
 A thoughtfully prepared environment where materials are organized by subject area, is accessible to children, and is appropriately sized
 Freedom, within limits
 A trained teacher experienced in observing a child's characteristics, tendencies, innate talents, and abilities

Montessori education involves free activity within a "prepared environment", meaning an educational environment tailored to basic human characteristics, to the specific characteristics of children at different ages, and to the individual personalities of each child. The function of the environment is to help and allow the child to develop independence in all areas according to their inner psychological directives. In addition to offering access to the Montessori materials appropriate to the age of the children, the environment should exhibit the following characteristics:

Education practices

Infant and toddler programs
Montessori classrooms for children under three fall into several categories, with a number of terms being used. A , Italian for "nest", serves a small number of children from around two months to around 14 months, or when the child is confidently walking. Both environments emphasize materials and activities scaled to the children's size and abilities, opportunities to develop movement, and activities to develop independence. The development of independence in toileting is typically emphasized as well. Some schools also offer "Parent-Infant" classes, in which parents participate with their very young children.

Preschool and kindergarten

A typical classroom serves 20 to 30 children in mixed-age groups, staffed by a fully trained lead teacher and assistants. Classrooms are usually outfitted with child-sized tables and chairs arranged singly or in small clusters, with classroom materials on child-height shelves throughout the room. Activities are for the most part initially presented by the teacher, after which they may be chosen more or less freely by the children as interest dictates. A teacher's role within a Montessori classroom is to guide and consult students individually by letting each child create their own learning pathway. Classroom materials usually include activities for engaging in practical skills such as pouring and spooning, washing up, scrubbing tables and sweeping. Also materials for the development of the senses, mathematical materials, language materials, music, art and cultural materials, including more science-based activities like 'sink and float', Magnetic and Non magnetic and candle and air.

Activities in Children's Houses are typically hands-on, tactile materials to teach concepts. For example, to teach writing, students use sandpaper letters. These are letters created by cutting letters out of sandpaper and placing them on wooden blocks. The children then trace these letters with their fingers to learn the shape and sound of each letter. Another example is the use of bead chains to teach math concepts, specifically multiplication. Specifically for multiples of 10, there is one bead that represents one unit, a bar of ten beads put together that represents 1×10, then a flat shape created by fitting 10 of the bars together to represent 10×10, and a cube created by fitting 10 of the flats together to represent 10×10×10. These materials help build a concrete understanding of basic concepts upon which much is built in the later years.

Elementary classrooms
Elementary school classrooms usually serve mixed-age 6- to 9-year-old and 9- to 12-year-old groupings; 6- to 12-year-old groups are also used. Lessons are typically presented to small groups of children, who are then free to follow up with independent work of their own as interest and personal responsibility dictate. Montessori educators give interdisciplinary lessons examining subjects ranging from biology and history to theology, which they refer to as "great lessons". These are typically given near the beginning of the school term and provide the basis for learning throughout the year. The great lessons offer inspiration and open doors to new areas of investigation.

Lessons include work in language, mathematics, history, the sciences, the arts, etc. Student-directed explorations of resources outside the classroom are integral to education. Montessori used the term "cosmic education" to indicate both the universal scope of lessons to be presented and the idea that education should help children realize the human role in the interdependent functioning of the universe.

Montessori schools are more flexible than traditional schools. In traditional schools, the students sit at tables or desks to do their work. At a Montessori school, the child gets to decide where they would like to work whether that is at a table or on the floor. It is about them going where they feel most comfortable. Anything a child would need during their learning experience is placed on a shelf that the student can easily get to. This promotes not only their learning, but also their independence because they do not need to ask for help as much. Montessori classrooms have an age range so that the younger students can look up to the older students and the older students can help the younger students as needed. It gives all age groups a chance to learn from one another.

Middle and high school
Montessori education for this level is less developed than programs for younger children. Montessori did not establish a teacher training program or a detailed plan of education for adolescents during her lifetime. However, a number of schools have extended their programs for younger children to the middle school and high school levels. In addition, several Montessori organizations have developed teacher training or orientation courses and a loose consensus on the plan of study is emerging. Montessori wrote that "The essential reform of our plan from this point of view may be defined as follows: during the difficult time of adolescence it is helpful to leave the accustomed environment of the family in town and to go to quiet surroundings in the country, close to nature".

Digital technology 
With the development of mobile touchscreen devices, some Montessori activities have been made into mobile apps. Mobile applications have been criticized due to the lack of physical interaction with objects.

Although not supported by all, most Montessori schools use digital technology with the purpose of preparing students for their future. Technology is not used the same as it would be used in a regular classroom, instead it is used "in meaningful ways". Students are not to simply replace "real-world activities with high-tech ones" such as the applications mentioned earlier.

Devices are not commonly used when students are being taught. When students have a question about something, they try to solve it themselves instead of turning to a device to try and figure out an answer. When a device is used by a student, the teacher expects them to use it in a meaningful way. There has to be a specific purpose behind using technology. Before using a device, the student should ask themselves if using this device is the best way or if it is the only way to do a certain task. If the answer is yes to both of those questions, then that would be considered using technology in a meaningful way.

Montessori's philosophy

Psychology
Montessori perceived specific elements of human psychology which her son and collaborator Mario Montessori identified as "human tendencies" in 1957. There is some debate about the exact list, but the following are clearly identified:

"Planes" of development
Montessori observed four distinct periods, or "planes", in human development, extending from birth to 6 years, from 6 to 12, from 12 to 18, and from 18 to 24. She saw different characteristics, learning modes, and developmental imperatives active in each of these planes and called for educational approaches specific to each period.

The first plane extends from birth to around six years of age. During this period, Montessori observed that the child undergoes striking physical and psychological development. The first-plane child is seen as a concrete, sensorial explorer and learner engaged in the developmental work of psychological self-construction and building functional independence. Montessori introduced several concepts to explain this work, including the absorbent mind, sensitive periods, and normalization.

Montessori described the young child's behavior of effortlessly assimilating the sensorial stimuli of his or her environment, including information from the senses, language, culture, and the development of concepts with the term "absorbent mind". She believed that this is a power unique to the first plane, and that it fades as the child approached age six. Montessori also observed and discovered periods of special sensitivity to particular stimuli during this time which she called the "sensitive periods". In Montessori education, the classroom environment responds to these periods by making appropriate materials and activities available while the periods are active in each individual young child. She identified the following periods and their durations:

 Acquisition of language—from birth to around 6 years old
 Interest in small objects—from around 18 months to 3 years old
 Order—from around 1 to 3 years old
 Sensory refinement—from birth to around 4 years old

Finally, Montessori observed in children from three to six years old a psychological state she termed "normalization". Normalization arises from concentration and focus on activity which serves the child's developmental needs, and is characterized by the ability to concentrate as well as "spontaneous discipline, continuous and happy work, social sentiments of help and sympathy for others".

The second plane of development extends from around six years to twelve years old. During this period, Montessori observed physical and psychological changes in children, and she developed a classroom environment, lessons, and materials, to respond to these new characteristics. Physically, she observed the loss of baby teeth and the lengthening of the legs and torso at the beginning of the plane, and a period of uniform growth following. Psychologically, she observed the "herd instinct", or the tendency to work and socialize in groups, as well as the powers of reason and imagination. Developmentally, she believed the work of the second-plane child is the formation of intellectual independence, of moral sense, and of social organization.

The third plane of development extends from around twelve years to around eighteen years of age, encompassing the period of adolescence. Montessori characterized the third plane by the physical changes of puberty and adolescence, but also psychological changes. She emphasized the psychological instability and difficulties in the concentration of this age, as well as the creative tendencies and the development of "a sense of justice and a sense of personal dignity". She used the term "valorization" to describe the adolescents' drive for an externally derived evaluation of their worth. Developmentally, Montessori believed that the work of the third plane child is the construction of the adult self in society.

The fourth plane of development extends from around eighteen years to around twenty-four years old. Montessori wrote comparatively little about this period and did not develop an educational program for the age. She envisioned young adults prepared by their experiences in Montessori education at the lower levels ready to fully embrace the study of culture and the sciences in order to influence and lead civilization. She believed that economic independence in the form of work for money was critical for this age, and felt that an arbitrary limit to the number of years in university-level study was unnecessary, as the study of culture could go on throughout a person's life.

Relationship to peace
Montessori believed that education had an important role in achieving world peace, stating in her 1936 book Education and Peace that "[p]reventing conflicts is the work of politics; establishing peace is the work of education." She felt that children allowed to develop according to their inner laws of development would give rise to a more peaceful and enduring civilization. From the 1930s to the end of her life, she gave a number of lectures and addresses on the subject.

Studies
A 2017 review on evaluations of Montessori education studies states that broad evidence exists that certain elements of the Montessori method (e.g., teaching early literacy through a phonics approach embedded in a rich language context, providing a sensorial foundation for mathematics education) are effective, although these studies suffer from several methodological limitations. At the same time, it was concluded that while some evidence exists that children may benefit cognitively and socially from Montessori education that sticks to original principles, it is less clear whether modern adapted forms of Montessori education are as effective. Lillard (2017) also reviews research on the outcomes of Montessori education.

A 1975 study published in Monographs of the Society for Research in Child Development showed that every year over a four-year period from Pre-K to Grade 2 children under a Montessori program had higher mean scores on the Stanford–Binet Intelligence Scales than those in DARCEE or traditional programs.

A 1981 study published in Young Children found that while Montessori programs could not be considered to have undergone detailed evaluation, they performed equal to or better than other programs in certain areas. A 2006 study published in Science magazine found that "when strictly implemented, Montessori education fosters social and academic skills that are equal or superior to those fostered by a pool of other types of schools." Another study in the Milwaukee Public Schools found that children who had attended Montessori from ages 3–11 outperformed their high school classmates several years later on mathematics and science; another found that Montessori had some of the largest positive effects on the achievement of all programs evaluated.

Some studies have not found positive outcomes for children in Montessori classrooms. For example, a 2005 study in a Buffalo public Montessori magnet school "failed to support the hypothesis that enrollment in a Montessori school was associated with higher academic achievement". Explicitly comparing outcomes of Montessori classrooms in which children spent extra time with Montessori materials, a standard amount of time with the Montessori materials ('classic Montessori'), or no time at all with the materials (because they were in conventional classrooms), Lillard (2012) found the best outcomes for children in classic Montessori.

A 2017 study published by The Hechinger Report claims that despite financial background, students in Montessori schools did score higher on academic tests than their peers in the same economic classes who did not attend Montessori schools.

Trademark and branding
In 1967, the US Patent and Trademark Office ruled that "the term 'Montessori' has a generic and/or descriptive significance." According to many Montessori advocates, the lack of trademark protection has led to public misconceptions of the method due to some schools' using the term without adhering to Montessorian principles.

In the Philippines, the Department of Education (DepED) has noted the proliferation of private schools which misuse the term "Montessori" similar to how educational institutes present themselves as "international schools". As per Department of Education, Culture and Sports (DECS; now DepED) Order 65 issued in June 1997, the education department along with the Securities and Exchange Commission shall allow schools to use the term "Montessori" only if they satisfy certain guidelines by the Federation of Philippine Montessori Schools.

See also
List of Montessori schools

References

Further reading

External links

 Association Montessori Internationale (AMI)
 The International Montessori Index (AMI)
 Association Montessori International/USA (AMI/USA)
 American Montessori Society (AMS)
 The Montessori Foundation
 
 Digitized library book copy of The Montessori System Examined on Internet Archive
 Montessori Accreditation Council for Teacher Education
 Montessori Bibliography Online
 Montessori Education Related Articles

 
Education theory
Educational practices
Pedagogy
Philosophy of education
Italian inventions